William Oakes may refer to:

William Oakes (botanist) (1799–1848), American botanist
William H. Oakes (died 1890), American music publisher
Will Oakes, Scottish rugby league player